Starbucktown is an unincorporated community in Clinton County, in the U.S. state of Ohio.

History
Starbucktown was settled by members of the local Starbuck family.

References

Unincorporated communities in Clinton County, Ohio
Unincorporated communities in Ohio